Delta-aminolevulinate synthase 2 also known as ALAS2 is a protein that in humans is encoded by the ALAS2 gene. ALAS2 is an aminolevulinic acid synthase.

The product of this gene specifies an erythroid-specific mitochondrially located enzyme. The encoded protein catalyzes the first step in the heme biosynthetic pathway. Defects in this gene cause X-linked pyridoxine-responsive sideroblastic anemia. Alternatively spliced transcript variants encoding different isoforms have been identified.

Its gene contains an IRE in its 5'-UTR region on which an IRP binds if the iron level is too low, thus inhibiting its translation.

References

Further reading

External links
 
GeneReviews/NCBI/NIH/UW entry on X-Linked Sideroblastic Anemia and Ataxia